Ramsey is an English toponymic surname of Old English origin, derived either from Ramsey in Huntingdonshire or Ramsey in Essex. Notable people with the surname include:

Aaron Ramsey (born 1990), Welsh footballer
Alexander Ramsey (1815–1903), American politician; second governor of Minnesota
Alf Ramsey (1920–1999), English football manager; led the England national football team to a World Cup victory
Alma Ramsey (1907–1993), British sculptor
Anne Ramsey (1929–1988), American actress
Arthur Stanley Ramsey (1867–1924), British mathematician
Bella Ramsey (born 2003), British actress
Ben Ramsey (politician) (1903–1985), American politician, former Lieutenant Governor of Texas
Bill Ramsey, multiple people
Boniface Ramsey (born 1945), American Roman Catholic priest
Charles H. Ramsey (born 1950), American former Washington, D.C. chief of police and Philadelphia police commissioner
Claude Ramsey (1943–2018), American farmer and politician
Dave Ramsey (born 1960), American talk-radio personality and financial advisor
DeWitt Clinton Ramsey (1888–1961), American naval commander
Edwin P. Ramsey (1917–2003), US Army officer and guerrilla leader during the Japanese World War II occupation of the Philippines
Elizabeth Ramsey (1931–2015), Filipino comedian, singer and actress
Emily Ramsey (footballer) (born 2000), English footballer
Franchesca Ramsey (born 1983), American activist, comedian, and YouTuber known as Chescaleigh
Frank Ramsey (basketball) (1931–2018), basketball Hall of Fame inductee
Frank P. Ramsey (1903–1930), early 20th century British mathematician; originator of Ramsey theory
Geoff Ramsey (born 1975), American voice actor
Gordon Ramsey (1930–1993), American television, stage and voice actor
Griffon Ramsey (1980), American chainsaw artist
Ian Ramsey (1915–1972), English philosopher and Bishop of Durham
Jahmi'us Ramsey (born 2001), American basketball player
Jalen Ramsey (born 1994), American football cornerback for the Los Angeles Rams
JonBenét Ramsey (1990–1996), American child beauty pageant contestant murdered in 1996
Joseph H. Ramsey (1816–1894), American politician
Justus Cornelius Ramsey (1821–1881), American politician
Logan Ramsey (1921–2000), American actor
Marion Ramsey (1947–2021), American actresses and singer
 Mary Ramsey (died 1601), English philanthropist
Mary Ramsey (born 1963), American singer/songwriter with rock band 10,000 Maniacs and folk duo John & Mary
Michael Ramsey (disambiguation), multiple people
Norman Foster Ramsey, Jr. (1915–2011), American physicist and Nobel prize laureate
Patrick Ramsey (born 1979), American professional football player
Paul Ramsey (disambiguation), multiple people
Randy Ramsey (born 1995), American football player
Robert Ramsey (disambiguation), multiple people
Rolla Ramsey (1872–1955), American physicist, university professor, and radio electronics pioneer
Sam Ramsey (1873–1956), Scottish-born Wales international rugby union player
Steve Ramsey (musician), British guitarist
Toad Ramsey (1864-1906), American baseball player
William Ramsey, multiple people

See also
Baron de Ramsey, title in the Peerage of the United Kingdom, created in 1887
Ramsay (surname)
Rasey

References

English-language surnames
English toponymic surnames
Surnames of Old English origin

de:Ramsey
fr:Ramsey